James D. Williams (February 18, 1943 – March 13, 1985) was a Democratic member of the Pennsylvania House of Representatives.

References

1985 deaths
Democratic Party members of the Pennsylvania House of Representatives
1943 births
20th-century American politicians